Greater Los Angeles is the second-largest metropolitan area in the United States (after New York), with a population of 18.5 million in 2021, encompassing five counties in Southern California extending from Ventura County in the west to San Bernardino County and Riverside County in the east, with Los Angeles County in the center and Orange County to the southeast. In addition to being the nexus of the global entertainment industry (films, television, and recorded music), Greater Los Angeles is also an important center of international trade, education, media, business, tourism, technology, and sports. It is the 3rd largest metropolitan area by nominal GDP in the world with an economy exceeding $1 trillion in output (behind Tokyo and New York City).

There are three contiguous component metropolitan areas in Greater Los Angeles: the Inland Empire, which can be broadly defined as Riverside and San Bernardino counties; the Ventura/Oxnard metropolitan area (or Ventura County); and the Los Angeles metropolitan area (also known as Metropolitan Los Angeles or Metro LA) consisting of Los Angeles and Orange counties only. The Census Bureau designates the latter as the Los Angeles–Long Beach–Anaheim metropolitan statistical area, the fifth largest metropolitan area in the western hemisphere and the second-largest metropolitan area in the United States, by population. San Diego–Tijuana, though contiguous with Greater Los Angeles at San Clemente and Temecula, is not part of it, but together both form part of the Southern California Megalopolis.

Throughout the 20th century, Greater Los Angeles was one of the fastest-growing regions in the United States, but growth has slowed since 2000. At the 2010 U.S. census, the smaller Los Angeles metro area had a population of nearly 13 million residents. In 2015, the Greater Los Angeles population was estimated to be about 18.7 million, making it the second largest metropolitan region in the country, behind New York, as well as one of the largest megacities in the world. Over time, droughts and wildfires have increased in frequency and become less seasonal and more year-round, further straining the region's water security.

Definitions

Los Angeles metropolitan area
The Los Angeles metropolitan area is defined by the U.S. Office of Management and Budget as the Los Angeles–Long Beach–Anaheim, CA Metropolitan Statistical Area (MSA), with a 2021 population of 12,997,353. The MSA is in turn made up of two "metropolitan divisions": 
 Los Angeles–Long Beach-Glendale, CA Metropolitan Division, coterminous with Los Angeles County (2021 population 9,829,544)
 Anaheim–Santa Ana–Irvine, CA Metropolitan Division, coterminous with Orange County (2021 population 3,167,809)

The MSA is the most populous metropolitan area in the Western United States and second-most populous in the United States. It has at its core the Los Angeles–Long Beach–Anaheim urban area, which had a population of 12,237,376 as of the 2020 census.

Greater Los Angeles
The U.S. Census Bureau also defines a wider commercial region based on commuting patterns or megalopolis, the Los Angeles–Long Beach, CA Combined Statistical Area (CSA), more commonly known as the Greater Los Angeles Area, with an estimated population of 18,490,242 in 2021. The total land area of the CSA is 33,955 sq. mi (87,945 km2).

The CSA consists of three component metropolitan areas:
 The Los Angeles–Long Beach–Anaheim, CA MSA (2021 pop. 12,997,353)
 The Oxnard–Thousand Oaks–Ventura, CA MSA, coterminous with Ventura County (2021 pop. 839,784)
 The Riverside–San Bernardino–Ontario, CA MSA (2021 pop. 4,653,105), consisting of:
 Riverside County, California (2021 pop. 2,458,395)
 San Bernardino County, California (2021 pop. 2,194,710)

History
Nearly all of the metropolitan area of Greater Los Angeles is located within the homelands of the Tongva, otherwise referred to as Tovaangar.

Geography

Urban form

If Los Angeles includes the urbanized area of the San Diego - Tijuana urban area, the urbanized areas of the IE and Santa Barbara, The greater Los Angeles - San Diego region has a solid urban landmass of 9,058 sq miles. This makes this urbanized area revolving Los Angeles and San Diego the biggest solid urban landmass in the world, passing Tokyo, New Delhi, and cities in the Pearl River Delta. Los Angeles has long been famous for its sprawl, but this has to do more with its status in history as the "poster child" of large cities that grew up with suburban-style patterns of development, rather than how it ranks in sprawl among American metro areas today, now that suburban and exurban-style development is present across the country.

Los Angeles' reputation for sprawl is due to the fact that the city grew from relative obscurity to one of the country's ten largest cities (i.e. 10th largest city in 1920), at a time when suburban patterns of growth first became possible due to electric streetcars and automobiles. The city was also the first large American city where, in the 1920s, major clusters of regional employment, shopping, and culture were already being built outside the traditional downtown areas – in edge cities such as Mid-Wilshire, Miracle Mile and Hollywood. This pattern of growth continued ever outward, more so when the freeway system was built starting in the 1950s; thus Greater Los Angeles was the earliest large American metropolitan area with a decentralized structure. Its major commercial, financial, and cultural institutions are geographically dispersed rather than being concentrated in a single downtown or central area. Also, the population density of Los Angeles proper is low (approximately 8,300 people per square mile) when compared to some other large American cities such as New York City (27,500), San Francisco (17,000), Boston (13,300), and Chicago (11,800). Densities are particularly high within a 5-mile radius of downtown, where some neighborhoods exceed 20,000 people per square mile. What gives the entire Los Angeles metro region a high density is the fact that many of the city's suburbs and satellite cities have high density rates. Within its urbanized areas, Los Angeles is noted for having small lot sizes and low-rise buildings. Buildings in the area are low when compared to other large cities, mainly due to zoning regulations. Los Angeles became a major city just as the Pacific Electric Railway spread population to smaller cities much as interurbans did in East Coast cities. In the first decades of the twentieth century, the area was marked by a network of fairly dense but separate cities linked by rail. The ascendance of the automobile helped fill in the gaps between these commuter towns with lower-density settlements.

Starting in the early twentieth century, there was a large growth in population on the western edges of the city moving to the San Fernando Valley and out into the Conejo Valley in eastern Ventura County. Many working-class whites migrated to this area during the 1960s and 1970s out of East and Central Los Angeles. As a result, there was a large growth in population into the Conejo Valley and into Ventura County through the US 101 corridor. Making the US 101 a full freeway in the 1960s and expansions that followed helped make commuting to Los Angeles easier and opened the way for development westward. Development in Ventura County and along the US 101 corridor remains controversial, with open-space advocates battling those who feel business development is necessary to economic growth. Although the area still has abundant amount of open space and land, almost all of it was put aside and mandated never to be developed as part of the master plan of each city. Because of this, the area which was once a relatively inexpensive area to buy real estate, saw rising real estate prices well into the 2000s. Median home prices in the Conejo Valley for instance, ranged from $700,000 to $2.2 million in 2003. According to Forbes, "it's nearly impossible" to find reasonably priced real estate in California, and the prices will continue to increase.

The Los Angeles area continues to grow, principally on the periphery where new, cheaper, undeveloped areas are being sought. As such, in these areas, populations as well as housing prices exploded, although the housing bubble popped late in the decade of the 2000s. Riverside and San Bernardino Counties, which contain large swaths of desert, attracted most of the population increase between 2000 and 2006. Growth continues not only outside the existing urbanized area but also adjacent to existing development in the central areas. As in virtually all US core cities, there is now vigorous residential development in the downtown area with both new buildings and renovation of former office buildings. The Los Angeles Downtown News keeps a list of ongoing development projects, updated every quarter.

Changes in house prices for the area are publicly tracked on a regular basis using the Case–Shiller index; the statistic is published by Standard & Poor's and is also a component of S&P's 10-city composite index of the value of the residential real estate market.

Major business districts and edge cities
Greater Los Angeles has numerous traditional downtowns or central business districts, the largest being Downtown Los Angeles. Other important ones are Downtown Long Beach, downtown Pasadena, downtown Glendale, and downtown Burbank, and – with their county, state and federal government facilities – Downtown Santa Ana, Downtown Riverside and Downtown San Bernardino.

However, most of the commercial activity (office space, retail, hotels, entertainment) is found outside traditional downtowns, among the suburban-style development in clusters known as edge cities. In fact, the Los Angeles area is considered the classic example of a metropolitan area that developed in this pattern, because it did so early in history, starting in the 1920s, and was the city to enter into the top ten of American cities while growing in this pattern.

Identity
Employment is not only in the downtown area, but consistently occurs outside the central core. As such, many people commute throughout the city and suburbs in various directions for their work and daily activities, with a large portion heading to the municipalities that are outside the city of Los Angeles.

Unlike most metropolitan areas, regional identity remains a contentious issue in the Greater Los Angeles area, with many residents not acknowledging any association with the region as a whole. For example, while Los Angeles County and Orange County together make up the smaller MSA region, the two have a host of sharp demographic, political, and financial distinctions. Orange County residents often attempt to be identified apart from Los Angeles although they make up the same metropolitan area. Also, while only 1.63% of Los Angeles residents commute to Orange County for work, over 6% of Orange County commuters head to Los Angeles for work. Western Riverside County and San Bernardino County have become commuter regions characteristic of other suburban counties throughout the nation. Residents in these counties often commute to Los Angeles County and Orange County for employment.

Component counties, subregions, and cities

Los Angeles County

Los Angeles County, of which Los Angeles is the county seat, is the most populous county in the United States and is home to over a quarter of all California residents. The large size of the city of Los Angeles, as well as its history of annexing smaller towns, has made city boundaries in the central area of Los Angeles County quite complicated. Many cities are completely surrounded by the city of Los Angeles and are often included in the city's areas despite being independent municipalities. For example, Santa Monica and Beverly Hills (which is almost completely surrounded by Los Angeles) are considered part of the Westside, while Hawthorne and Inglewood are associated with South L.A. Adjacent areas that are outside the actual city boundaries of incorporated Los Angeles but border the city itself include the Santa Clarita Valley, the San Gabriel Valley, South Bay, and the Gateway Cities.

Despite the large footprint of the city of Los Angeles, a majority of the land area within Los Angeles County is unincorporated and under the primary jurisdiction of Los Angeles County. Much of this land, however, cannot be easily developed due to planning challenges presented by geographic features such as the Santa Monica Mountains, the San Gabriel Mountains, and the Mojave Desert. Actual land development in these regions occurs on the fringes of incorporated cities, some of which have been fully developed, such as the cities of Palmdale and Lancaster.

Subregions in Los Angeles County
While there is not official designation for the regions that comprise Greater Los Angeles, one authority, the Los Angeles Times, divides the area into the following regions:
 Angeles Forest
 Antelope Valley
 Central L.A. (Downtown Los Angeles, Hollywood, Mid-Wilshire, etc.)
 Eastside
 Gateway Cities/Harbor Area
 Northeast L.A. (Highland Park, Eagle Rock, etc.)
 Northwest L.A. County (including the Santa Clarita Valley)
 Pomona Valley (partially in San Bernardino County)
 San Fernando Valley
 San Gabriel Valley
 Santa Monica Mountains (Malibu, Topanga, etc.)
 South Bay (incl. Palos Verdes Peninsula, Beach Cities)
 South Los Angeles
 Southeast Los Angeles County (including Norwalk and Whittier, see Gateway Cities)
 The Verdugos (including Glendale, Pasadena and the Crescenta Valley)
 Westside

Some of the above areas can be defined as being bounded by natural features such as mountains or the ocean; others are marked by city boundaries, freeways, or other constructed landmarks. For example, Downtown Los Angeles is the area of Los Angeles roughly enclosed by three freeways and one river: the Harbor Freeway (SR 110) to the west, the Santa Ana Freeway (US 101) to the north, the Los Angeles River to the east, and the Santa Monica Freeway (I-10) to the south. Meanwhile, the San Fernando Valley ("The Valley") is defined as the basin consisting of the part of Los Angeles and its suburbs that lie north-northwest of downtown and is ringed by mountains.

Edge cities in Los Angeles County

Central and Western area
Beverly Hills/Century City
LAX/El Segundo
Marina Del Rey/Culver City
Mid-Wilshire
Miracle Mile

San Fernando Valley
Burbank/North Hollywood
Sherman Oaks/Van Nuys, Los Angeles
Warner Center, Los Angeles/West Valley
West Los Angeles

Elsewhere in Los Angeles County
Pasadena
South Bay/Torrance/Carson
South Valley/Covina (emerging edge city as of 1991)
Santa Clarita (emerging edge city as of 1991)

Cities in Los Angeles County
With a population of nearly 3.9 million people at the 2020 census, the City of Los Angeles is the second most populous city in the United States after New York City, and is the focal point of the Greater Los Angeles Area. As an international center for finance, entertainment, media, culture, education, tourism, and science, Los Angeles is considered one of the world's most powerful and influential global cities.

List of cities with populations of 50,000 or more at the 2020 U.S. census:

 Los Angeles (3,898,747)
 Long Beach (466,742)
 Santa Clarita (228,673)
 Glendale (196,543)
 Lancaster (173,516)
 Palmdale (169,450)
 Pomona (151,713)
 Torrance (147,067)
 Pasadena (138,699)
 Downey (114,355)
 West Covina (109,501)
 El Monte (109,450)
 Inglewood (107,762)
 Burbank (107,337)
 Norwalk (102,773)
 Compton (95,740)
 Carson (95,558)
 Santa Monica (93,076)
 South Gate (92,726)
 Hawthorne (88,083)
 Whittier (87,306)
 Alhambra (82,868)
 Lakewood (82,496)
 Bellflower (79,190)
 Baldwin Park (72,176)
 Redondo Beach (71,576)
 Lynwood (67,265)
 Montebello (62,640)
 Pico Rivera (62,088)
 Monterey Park (61,096)
 Gardena (61,027)
 Arcadia (56,681)
 Monrovia (37,931)
 Diamond Bar (55,072)
 Paramount (53,733)
 Glendora (52,558)
 Covina (51,268)
 Rosemead (51,185)
 Azusa (50,000)

Orange County

Orange County was originally an agricultural area dependent on citrus crops, avocados, and oil extraction, and became a bedroom community for Los Angeles when I–5, the Santa Ana Freeway, linked it to the city in the 1950s. The growth of Los Angeles initially fueled population growth in Orange County, but by the 1970s it had become an important economic center in its own right, with tourism and electronics industries, among others. Today, Orange County is known for its tourist attractions, such as Disneyland, Knott's Berry Farm, its several pristine beaches and coastline, and its wealthier areas, featured in television shows such as The O.C. No one of the original downtowns serves as the central urban core for the county, but there are important clusters of business and culture in Downtown Santa Ana and in three edge cities: the Anaheim–Santa Ana edge city from Disneyland to the Orange Crush interchange (Orange, Santa Ana), the South Coast Plaza–John Wayne Airport edge city (Santa Ana, Costa Mesa, Irvine), and Irvine's Spectrum edge city.

Orange County is sometimes figuratively divided into "North County" and "South County", with North Orange County including cities such as Anaheim, Fullerton, and Santa Ana, and is the older, more ethnically diverse and more densely built-up area closer to Los Angeles. South County, defined variously as beginning with either Costa Mesa or Irvine and includes cities to the east and south such as Laguna Beach, Mission Viejo, Newport Beach, and San Clemente, is more residential, affluent, recently developed, and has a mostly white population. Irvine is an exception, as it is a center of employment and is ethnically diverse. A growing alternative dividing marker between north and south is the El Toro Y interchange. Orange Coast or South Coast area is defined instead, consisting of some or all of the cities lining the coast.

Subregions in Orange County
North Orange County
South Orange County

Edge cities in Orange County
Anaheim–Santa Ana edge city
Fullerton/La Habra/Brea (emerging edge city as of 1991)
Irvine Spectrum
Newport Center/Fashion Island (emerging edge city as of 1991)
San Clemente/Laguna Niguel (emerging edge city as of 1991)
South Coast Plaza–John Wayne Airport edge city
Westminster/Huntington Beach

Cities in Orange County
Cities in Orange County with a population of 50,000 or more at the 2020 census:

 Anaheim (346,824)
 Santa Ana (310,227)
 Irvine (307,670)
 Huntington Beach (198,711)
 Garden Grove (171,949)
 Fullerton (143,617)
 Orange (139,911)
 Costa Mesa (111,918)
 Mission Viejo (93,653)
 Westminster (90,911)
 Lake Forest (85,858)
 Newport Beach (85,239)
 Buena Park (84,034)
 Tustin (80,276)
 Yorba Linda (68,336)
 Laguna Niguel (64,355)
 San Clemente (64,293)
 La Habra (63,097)
 Fountain Valley (57,047)
 Aliso Viejo (52,176)
 Placentia (51,824)
 Cypress (50,151)

Inland Empire

The Inland Empire, consisting of San Bernardino and Riverside Counties, contains fast-growing suburbs of the region, with a large to majority percentage of the working population commuting to either Los Angeles or Orange Counties for work. Originally an important center for citrus production, the region became an important industrial area by the early 20th century. The Inland Empire also became a key transportation center following the completion of Route 66, and later Interstate 10. With the post-World War II economic boom leading to rapid development in Los Angeles and Orange Counties, land developers bulldozed acres of agricultural land to build suburbs in order to accommodate the Los Angeles area's expanding population. The development of a regional freeway system facilitated the expansion of suburbs and human migration linking the Inland Empire and rest of Greater Los Angeles. Despite being primarily suburban, the Inland Empire is also home to important warehousing, shipping, logistics and retail industries, centered on the subregion's major cities of Riverside, San Bernardino and Ontario.

While the Inland Empire is sometimes defined as the entirety of San Bernardino and Riverside Counties, the eastern undeveloped, desert portions of these counties are not considered to be part of Greater Los Angeles. The state of California defines this area to include the cities of Adelanto, Apple Valley, and Victorville to the north, the Riverside–San Diego county line to the south, and the towns of Anza, Idyllwild, and Lucerne Valley, along with the San Bernardino National Forest to the east. However, with clear northern and southern limits to expansion, the region's urban eastern boundaries have become increasingly nebulous as suburban sprawl continues to spread out to form a unified whole with Los Angeles, with further development encroaching past the San Bernardino and San Jacinto Mountains and into the outlying desert areas. As a result, the regional definition of Greater Los Angeles can now be extended to include Barstow and surrounding towns in the northeast, the Morongo Basin in the east-central including Yucca Valley and Twentynine Palms, and the Coachella Valley cities in the southeast. This interconnectivity, provided by one of the most extensive freeway systems in the world, as well as economic, social and media ties, has blended boundaries between these regions and the urbanized Los Angeles and Inland Empire areas.

Subregions in the Inland Empire
 High Desert (includes Antelope Valley in Los Angeles County plus Victor Valley and Morongo Basin)
 Low Desert (Coachella Valley, Palm Springs and Palm Desert area)
 San Bernardino Mountains (Lake Arrowhead and Big Bear Lake area)
 Northwest Riverside County (Corona, Norco, Jurupa Valley, and Riverside area)
 Moreno Valley (Moreno Valley and Perris)
 Pomona Valley (Pomona, Rancho Cucamonga, Chino, Eastvale, Upland, Claremont, Montclair, La Verne and Ontario area. Partially in Los Angeles County)
 San Bernardino Valley (San Bernardino, Fontana, Rialto, Colton, Loma Linda, Highland, and Redlands area)
 San Gorgonio Pass (Banning, Yucaipa, Calimesa, and Beaumont area)
 San Jacinto Valley (Hemet and San Jacinto area)
 Temecula Valley (Lake Elsinore, Menifee, Murrieta, Wildomar, and Temecula area)

Edge cities in the Inland Empire
Ontario Airport/Rancho Cucamonga
Riverside (emerging edge city as of 1991)
San Bernardino (emerging edge city as of 1991)

Cities in the Inland Empire 
List of cities with populations of 50,000 or more at the 2020 U.S. census:

 Riverside (314,998)
 San Bernardino (222,101)
 Moreno Valley (208,634)
 Fontana (208,393)
 Ontario (175,265)
 Rancho Cucamonga (174,453)
 Corona (157,136)
 Pomona (151,713)
 Victorville (134,810)
 Murrieta (110,949)
 Temecula (110,003)
 Jurupa Valley (105,053)
 Rialto (104,026)
 Menifee (102,527)
 Hesperia (99,818)
 Chino (91,403)
 Hemet (89,833)
 Indio (89,137)
 Upland (79,040)
 Perris (78,700)
 Chino Hills (78,411)
 Apple Valley (75,791)
 Redlands (73,168)
 Lake Elsinore (70,265)
 Eastvale (69,757)
 Highland (56,999)
 Yucaipa (54,542)
 Colton (53,909)
 San Jacinto (53,898)
 Beaumont (53,036)
 Cathedral City (51,493)
 Palm Desert (51,163)

Sparsely populated areas in the Inland Empire
While the above areas are included in the regional definition of Greater Los Angeles, the U.S. Census Bureau defines Greater Los Angeles, or officially, the Los Angeles-Long Beach Combined Statistical Area, to include both the above-mentioned areas along with the entirety of San Bernardino and Riverside counties. These areas are sparsely developed and are part of the Mojave and Colorado Deserts. To the north, Interstate 15 crosses desolate desert landscape after passing Barstow, linking Greater Los Angeles with Las Vegas, with Baker being the only significant outpost along the route. To the east, lie the Mojave National Preserve and Joshua Tree National Park along with the towns of Needles and Blythe on the California-Arizona border.

Ventura County

Ventura County is mostly suburban and rural and also has developed primarily through the growth of Los Angeles. Central and southern Ventura County formerly consisted of small towns along the Pacific Coast until the expansion of U.S. Route 101 drew in commuters from the San Fernando Valley. Master-planned cities soon began developing, and the county became increasingly urbanized. The northern part of the county, however, remains largely undeveloped and is mostly within the Los Padres National Forest.

Subregions in Ventura County
 Conejo Valley
 Oxnard Plain

Edge cities in Ventura County
Ventura/Coastal Plain (emerging edge city as of 1991)

Cities in Ventura County 

 Oxnard (202,063)
 Thousand Oaks (126,966)
 Simi Valley (126,356)
 Ventura (110,763)
 Camarillo (70,741)
 Moorpark (36,284)
 Santa Paula (30,657)
 Port Hueneme (21,954)
 Fillmore (16,419)
 Ojai (7,637)

Urban areas within 

At the core of the Los Angeles–Long Beach combined statistical area (CSA) lies the Los Angeles–Long Beach–Anaheim, CA urban area, the second most populous in the United States. Within the boundaries of the CSA the Census Bureau defines 30 other urban areas as well, two of which (Riverside–San Bernardino and Oxnard–Ventura) form the core of their own metropolitan areas separate from the Los Angeles metropolitan statistical area. Urban areas situated primarily outside the Los Angeles metropolitan statistical area but within the CSA are identified with a cross (†) in the table below.

Demographics

According to the 2010 census, there were 17,877,006 people living in the Greater Los Angeles Area. The racial makeup of the area was 54.9% White (39.0% White Non-Hispanic), 12.3% Asian, 0.3% Pacific Islander, 7.0% African American, 0.8% Native American, 20.2% from other races, and 4.5% from two or more races. 44.9% of the population (8.0 million) were Hispanic of any race, including 35.7% of the population (6.4 million) which was of Mexican origin. 31.0% of the population (5.5 million) was foreign born; 18.3% (3.3 million) came from Latin America and 9.8% (1.7 million) from Asia.

The explosive growth of the region in the 20th century can be attributed to its favorable Mediterranean climate, the availability of land and many booming industries such as oil, automobile and rubber, motion pictures and aerospace which in turn attracted millions of people from all over the United States and world. Citrus production was important to the region's development in the earlier part of the 20th century.

While the New York metropolitan area is presently the most populous metropolitan area in the United States, it has been predicted in the past that Greater Los Angeles will eventually surpass Greater New York in population. Whether this will happen is yet to be seen, but past predictions on this event have been off the mark. A 1966 article in Time predicted Greater Los Angeles would surpass New York by 1975, and that by 1990, would reach close to the 19 million mark. But the article's flawed definition of Greater Los Angeles included San Diego, which is actually its own metropolitan area. A 1989 article in The New York Times predicted Greater Los Angeles would surpass Greater New York by 2010, but the article predicted the population would be 18.3 million in that year, a number Greater New York already surpassed in 2007 by half a million people. By 2009, the New York metropolitan area had a population of 22.2 million compared to the Greater Los Angeles Area's 18.7 million, about a 3.56 million persons difference. Percentage growth, however, has been higher in Greater Los Angeles over the past few decades than in Greater New York.

Demographics of Los Angeles and Orange counties

Age and gender
According to the 2009 American Community Survey, the Los Angeles Metropolitan Area had a population of 12,874,797, of which 6,402,498 (49.7% of the population) were male and 6,472,299 (50.3% of the population) were female. The age composition is shown in the table at right.

Median age: 34.6 years

Race
According to the survey, the Los Angeles Metropolitan Area was 54.6% White (32.2% non-Hispanic White alone), 7.0% Black or African American, 0.5% American Indian and Alaska Native, 13.9% Asian, 0.3% Native Hawaiian and Other Pacific Islander, 20.6% from Some other race, and 3.2% from Two or more races. Hispanics or Latinos of any race made up 44.8% of the population.

Whites are the racial majority; whites (both Hispanic and non-Hispanic) make up 54.6% of the population. Non-Hispanic whites make up under one-third (32.2%) of the population. Approximately 7,028,533 residents are white, of which 4,150,426 are non-Hispanic whites. The top five European ancestries were German: 6.9% (883,124), Irish: 5.3% (786,541), English: 4.8% (619,364), Italian: 3.3% (425,056), and French: 1.6% (204,635).

Asians make up 13.9% of the population, the largest racial minority, since Hispanic/Latino is an ethnicity of any race. Asians of non-Hispanic origin make up 13.7% of the population. Approximately 1,790,140 residents are Asian, of which 1,770,225 are Asians of non-Hispanic origin. The six Asian ancestries mentioned were Filipino: 3.5% (454,086), Chinese: 3.0% (390,192), Korean: 2.1% (274,288), Vietnamese: 2.0% (254,353), Japanese: 1.0% (134,466) and Indian: 0.9% (116,090). "Other Asian" is an additional category that includes people who did not identify themselves as any of the groups above. This group includes people of Cambodian, Laotian, Pakistani, Burmese, Taiwanese, and Thai descent, among others. Approximately 166,665 people are in this category, and they make up 1.3% of the population.

African Americans or Blacks make up 7.0% of the population. Non-Hispanic blacks make up 6.7% of the population. Approximately 895,931 residents are black, of which 864,737 are non-Hispanic blacks. In the survey, 136,024 people identified their ancestry as "Sub-Saharan African", equal to 1.1% of the population.

Native Americans make up 0.5% of the population (68,822), with those of non-Hispanic origin making up 0.2% (26,134). Approximately 3,872 Cherokee, 1,679 Navajo, 1,000 Chippewa, and 965 Sioux reside in the area.

Native Hawaiians and other Pacific Islanders make up 0.3% of the population. Approximately 37,719 residents are Native Hawaiian or of other Pacific Islander ancestries, of which 33,982 are of non-Hispanic origin. The three Pacific Islander ancestries mentioned were Samoan: 0.1% (13,519), Native Hawaiian: 0.1% (6,855), and Guamanian or Chamorro: <0.1% (4,581). "Other Pacific Islander" is an additional category that includes people who did not identify themselves as any of the groups above. This group includes people of Fijian and Tongan descent, among others. Approximately 12,764 people are in this category, and they make up 0.1% of the population.

Multiracial people make up 3.2% of the population, of which 1.8% were of non-Hispanic origin. Approximately 405,568 people are multiracial, of which 228,238 are of non-Hispanic origin. The four multiracial ancestries mentioned were White and Asian: 0.8% (107,585), White and American Indian: 0.4% (55,960), White and Black or African American: 0.4% (53,476), and Black or African American and American Indian: 0.1% (12,661).

Hispanic or Latino origin
Hispanic or Latinos, who may be of any race, are by far, the largest minority group; Hispanics or Latinos make up 44.8% of the population. They outnumber every other racial group. Approximately 5,763,181 residents are Hispanic or Latino. The three Hispanic or Latino ancestries mentioned were Mexican: 35.5% (4,570,776), Puerto Rican: 0.4% (48,780), and Cuban: 0.4%, (47,056). "Other Hispanic or Latino" is an additional category that includes people who did not identify themselves as any of the groups above. This group include people of Costa Rican, Salvadoran, and Colombian descent, among others. Approximately 1,096,569 people are in this category, and they make up 8.5% of the population.

Source: Factfinder.census.gov. Retrieved on July 29, 2013. Part 1: American FactFinder . Part 2: American FactFinder .

Politics

Greater Los Angeles is a politically divided metropolitan area. During the 1970s and 1980s, the region leaned toward the Republican Party. Los Angeles County, the most populous of the region, is a Democratic stronghold, although it voted twice for both Richard Nixon (1968 and 1972) and Ronald Reagan (1980 and 1984). Riverside County, San Bernardino County, and Orange County have historically leaned toward the Republican Party but have started shifting leftward in recent years. Ventura County is politically divided.

Economy
The Greater Los Angeles Area has the third largest metropolitan economy in the world, behind Greater Tokyo Area and New York Metropolitan Area. A 2010 Greyhill Advisors study indicated that the Los Angeles metropolitan area had a gross metropolitan product of $736 billion. In 2017, the Combined statistical area of Greater Los Angeles (which includes the Los Angeles metropolitan area, the Inland Empire and Ventura County) had a $1.252 trillion economy.

Greater Los Angeles Area is the home of the US national headquarters of almost all Asian major car manufacturers except Nissan, Toyota, and Subaru (Nissan moved to Tennessee; Toyota moved to Texas; Subaru first located in Philadelphia but moved to New Jersey); Honda, Mazda, Mitsubishi, Suzuki, Hyundai and Kia have set up their national headquarters here.

The economy of the Los Angeles metropolitan area is famously and heavily based on the entertainment industry, with a particular focus on television, motion pictures, interactive games, and recorded music – the Hollywood district of Los Angeles and its surrounding areas are known as the "movie capital of the United States" due to the region's extreme commercial and historical importance to the American motion picture industry. Other significant sectors include shipping/international trade – particularly at the adjacent Port of Los Angeles and Port of Long Beach, together comprising the United States' busiest seaport – as well as aerospace, technology, petroleum, fashion and apparel, and tourism.

The City of Los Angeles is home to five Fortune 500 companies: energy company Occidental Petroleum (until 2014 when it moved its headquarters to Houston), healthcare provider Health Net, metals distributor Reliance Steel & Aluminum, engineering firm AECOM, and real estate group CB Richard Ellis. Other companies headquartered in Los Angeles include American Apparel, City National Bank, 20th Century Fox, Latham & Watkins, Univision, Metro Interactive, LLC, Premier America, Gibson, Dunn & Crutcher, DeviantArt, Guess?, O’Melveny & Myers; Paul, Hastings, Janofsky & Walker, Tokyopop, The Jim Henson Company, Paramount Pictures, Sunkist Growers, Incorporated, Tutor Perini, Fox Sports Net, Capital Group, and The Coffee Bean & Tea Leaf. Korean Air's US passenger and cargo operations headquarters are in two separate offices in Los Angeles. Entertainment and media giant The Walt Disney Company is headquartered in nearby Burbank.

Los Angeles and Orange Counties together have an economy of roughly $1.044 trillion (estimated for 2017), or the total economic output or income of Indonesia's 250 million people; important are coastal California land values and the rents they command, which contribute heavily to GDP earnings, though there are worries that these high land values contribute to the long-term problem of housing affordability and are thus a possible risk to future GDP increase. This is evident when comparing the coast with the Inland Empire, a large component of the five-county combined statistical area (CSA) that nevertheless contributes a far smaller portion to regional gross metropolitan product but still dominates in industry. The Greater Los Angeles CSA is the third-largest economic center in the world, after Greater Tokyo and the New York-Newark-Bridgeport CSA.

 The Port of Los Angeles and Port of Long Beach together comprise the fifth-busiest port in the world, being the center of imports and exports for trade on the west Pacific Coast as well as being one of the most significant ports of the western hemisphere. The Port of Los Angeles occupies  of land and water along  of waterfront and is the busiest container port in the United States. The Port is the busiest port in the United States by container volume, the 8th busiest container port in the world. The top trading partners in 2004 were: China ($68.8 billion), Japan ($24.1 billion), Taiwan ($10.8 billion), Thailand ($6.7 billion), & South Korea ($5.6 billion)

The Port of Long Beach is the second-busiest container port in the United States. It adjoins the separate Port of Los Angeles. The seaport has approximately $100 billion in trade and provides more than 316,000 jobs in Southern California. The Port of Long Beach imports and exports more than $100 billion worth of goods every year. The seaport provides the country with jobs, generates tax revenue, and supports retail and manufacturing businesses.

Economic statistics for Los Angeles and Orange Counties
In 2014, the population of the Long Beach–Los Angeles–Anaheim metropolitan statistical area (MSA) reached 13,262,220 and ranked second in the United States – a 1 percent increase from 2013. In 2014, Los Angeles-Long Beach-Anaheim had a per capita personal income (PCPI) of $50,751 and ranked 29th in the country.

In 2014, Los Angeles-Long Beach-Anaheim placed third among the largest exporters in the United States (shipment totaling to $75.5 billion). The metro accounted for 40.8 percent of California's merchandise exports, mainly exporting computer and electronic products ($18.6 billion); transportation equipment ($15.3 billion) and chemicals ($5.6 billion). Nonetheless, the greater Los Angeles metro has immensely benefited from the free trade agreements: greater Los Angeles exported $25.1 billion to the NAFTA region and $776 million in goods to the CAFTA region.

Overall, in 2014 the average wages and salaries reached $57,519 (in 2010, the average wages and salaries reached $54,729). Meanwhile, the median household income in 2014 was $56,935, a 1.4 percent increase from 2013 (average median household income was $56,164).

Note: Dollar items are in current dollars (not adjusted for inflation). Per capita items in dollars; other dollar items in thousands of dollars.

Table 2 (refer below) is a chart of the four highest sectors in the metro area, with health care and social assistance reaching 15.54%.

Table 3 (refer below) displays the location quotient for employment in the Los Angeles-Long Beach-Anaheim MSA. Top three sectors include information; art, entertainment, and recreation; and real estate and rental and leasing. (Data obtained from the Bureau of Labor Statistics, 2014. Data measures Location Quotient for sectors in the MSA area. U.S. Total is the base areas.)

Utilities and infrastructure
There are nine electric utility power companies in the Los Angeles metropolitan area. Southern California Edison serves a large majority of the Los Angeles metropolitan area except for Los Angeles city limits, Burbank, Glendale, Pasadena, Azusa, Vernon, Anaheim, and southern Orange County. Southern Orange County is part of the Los Angeles metropolitan area and it is served by San Diego Gas & Electric. There are three natural gas providers in the metropolitan area. Southern California Gas Company serves a large majority of the Los Angeles metropolitan area except for Long Beach and southern Orange County.

The Los Angeles metropolitan area is served by the following utility companies.

Electricity
 Southern California Edison (largest electric utility in the Los Angeles metropolitan area)
 Los Angeles Department of Water and Power (second-largest electric utility in the Los Angeles metropolitan area and the largest within the Los Angeles city limits)
 Burbank Water and Power
 Glendale Water and Power
 Pasadena Water and Power
 Anaheim Water and Power
 Azusa Light & Power
 Vernon Light & Power
 San Diego Gas & Electric (serves southern Orange County, which is part of the Los Angeles metropolitan area)

The only nuclear power plant that serves the Los Angeles metropolitan area is Palo Verde Nuclear Generating Station in the US state of Arizona 46 miles west of Phoenix. LADWP and Southern California Edison get their electricity from it.

Natural gas
 Southern California Gas Company
 City of Long Beach Gas Company
 San Diego Gas & Electric (serves southern Orange County, which is part of the Los Angeles metropolitan area)

Cable television
 Charter Communications, known as Charter Spectrum (serves a majority of the Los Angeles metropolitan area)
 Cox Communications (serves parts of Orange County and the Palos Verdes peninsula)

Phone and Internet

 AT&T
 T-Mobile
 Verizon
 Metro PCS
 cricket Wireless
 Frontier Communications
 Charter Spectrum

Medical facilities
Greater Los Angeles is one of the world's largest patient destinations. The Los Angeles Medical Services provide quality medical services and specialty care services to the populations served in compliance with local, state and federal regulations as well as human rights protection. 

Los Angeles and Orange counties have separate medical service department but both work jointly. Government and Private hospitals open normally Monday through Friday, excluding City Holidays but some speciality hospitals are open year-round. 

The main healthcare providers in the Los Angeles metropolitan area are Kaiser Permanente, Dignity Healthcare, and Providence Healthcare. LA Care and Care1st are also the main providers for those in the metropolitan area that have Medi-Cal.

Events

Major events include:
Auto Club 400, Inland Empire
BNP Paribas Open
Fashion Week El Paseo, Palm Springs
Holidays at the Disneyland Resort
LA Auto Show
Laguna Beach Pageant of the Masters
Los Angeles Film Festival
Newport Beach Christmas boat parade
Newport Beach Wine and Food Festival
Palm Springs International Film Festival
Palm Springs Modernism Week
Rose Parade
Temecula Valley Balloon & Wine Festival
Vans U.S. Open of Surfing

Awards ceremonies
Academy Awards
Primetime Emmy Awards
Golden Globes
Grammy Awards
Screen Actors Guild Awards

Annual county fairs
 Los Angeles County Fair at Fairplex in Pomona
 Orange County Fair in Costa Mesa
 Riverside County Fair and Date Festival

Annual Conventions
 Anime Expo
 BlizzCon
 D23 Expo
 Electronic Entertainment Expo
 L.A. Comic Con
 Los Angeles Auto Show
 NAMM Show
 VidCon
 WonderCon

Tourism and attractions

Due to L.A.'s position as The Entertainment Capital of the World, there are many tourist attractions in the area. Consequently, Greater Los Angeles is one of the most visited areas in the world. Here is a breakdown of some of its major attractions:

Amusement parks 

 Disneyland
 Disney's California Adventure
 Knott's Berry Farm
 Pacific Park
 Six Flags Magic Mountain
 Universal Studios Hollywood

Beaches 

 Capistrano Beach
 Corona del Mar
 Dana Point
 El Porto
 El Segundo
 Hermosa Beach
 Huntington Beach
 Laguna Beach
 Long Beach
 Los Angeles
 Malibu
 Manhattan Beach
 Marina del Rey
 Newport Beach
 Pacific Palisades
 Palos Verdes Estates
 Playa del Rey
 Rancho Palos Verdes
 Redondo Beach
 San Clemente
 San Pedro
 Santa Monica
 Seal Beach
 Sunset Beach
 Venice Beach

Shopping centers and districts 
There are hundreds of shopping centers and shopping districts across the area. Some key ones that attract out-of-area visitors are listed here; see also the Table of Shopping Centers in Southern California for a more complete list. 

 Anaheim GardenWalk near Disneyland
 Beverly Center near West Hollywood
 Del Amo Fashion Center, Torrance
 Downtown Disney
 Fashion District, Downtown Los Angeles
 Fashion Island, Newport Beach
 Hollywood and Highland
 Irvine Spectrum Center
 Melrose Avenue, Hollywood
 Old Pasadena
 Ontario Mills
 Rodeo Drive and downtown Beverly Hills
 The Grove at Farmer's Market, Fairfax District
 South Coast Plaza, Costa Mesa
 Third Street Promenade and Santa Monica Place, Santa Monica
 Universal CityWalk
 Westfield Century City

Visitors may also stroll Broadway and 7th streets in Downtown Los Angeles, the main shopping districts until the 1950s, to see the architecture of the buildings that once housed the large downtown department stores such as the May Company, Bullock's, The Broadway, Desmond's, Coulter's, Barker Brothers, and J. W. Robinson's.

Film and TV studio tours

 Sony Pictures Entertainment
 Universal Studios
 Walt Disney Studios
 Warner Brothers Studios
 The Studios at Paramount

Water parks 

 Dry Town Water Park
 Raging Waters
 Knott's Soak City
 Six Flags Hurricane Harbor
 Wild Rivers
 Great Wolf Lodge

Zoos and aquariums 

 Aquarium of the Pacific
 Griffith Park Zoo (Defunct)
 Los Angeles Zoo
 Montebello Barnyard Zoo
 Ocean Institute
 Orange County Zoo
 Santa Ana Zoo

Museums 

There are over 100 museums in the area, with some of the most widely visited being:
 Academy Museum of Motion Pictures
 Bowers Museum
 California African American Museum
 California Science Center
 Children's Museum of Los Angeles
 Chinese American Museum
 Discovery Cube Los Angeles
 Discovery Cube Orange County
 El Pueblo de Los Ángeles Historical Monument
 Getty Center
 Grammy Museum
 Griffith Observatory
 Hammer Museum
 Hollywood Wax Museum
 Huntington Library
 La Brea Tar Pits and Page Museum
 Los Angeles County Museum of Art
 Mission San Buenaventura
 Mission San Fernando Rey de España
 Mission San Gabriel Arcángel
 Mission San Juan Capistrano
 Movieland Wax Museum
 Museum of Contemporary Art
 Museum of Tolerance
 Natural History Museum of Los Angeles County
 Nethercutt Collection
 Norton Simon Museum
 Orange County Museum of Art
 Queen Mary
 Richard Nixon Birthplace
 Richard Nixon Presidential Library and Museum
 Ripley's Believe It or Not!
 Ronald Reagan Presidential Library
 Southwest Museum of the American Indian
 Travel Town Museum
 USC Fisher Museum of Art
 Watts Towers

Convention Centers 

 Anaheim Convention Center
 Los Angeles Convention Center
 Pasadena Convention Center
 Long Beach Convention Center
 Ontario Convention Center

State parks & beaches 

 Antelope Valley California Poppy State Reserve
 Antelope Valley Indian Museum State Historic Park
 Arthur B. Ripley Desert Woodland State Park
 Bolsa Chica State Beach
 Castaic Lake State Recreation Area
 Corona del Mar State Beach
 Crystal Cove State Park
 Dockweiler State Beach
 Doheny State Beach
 Emma Wood State Beach
 Huntington State Beach
 Kenneth Hahn State Recreation Area
 Leo Carrillo State Park
 Los Angeles State Historic Park
 Los Encinos State Historic Park
 Malibu Creek State Park
 Malibu Lagoon State Beach
 Mandalay State Beach
 McGrath State Beach
 Pescadero State Beach
 Pío Pico State Historic Park
 Placerita Canyon State Park
 Point Dume State Beach
 Point Mugu State Park
 Rio de Los Angeles State Park
 Robert H. Meyer Memorial State Beach
 Saddleback Butte State Park
 San Buenaventura State Beach
 San Clemente State Beach
 San Onofre State Beach
 Santa Monica State Beach
 Santa Susana Pass State Historic Park
 Topanga State Park
 Verdugo Mountains State Recreation Area
 Watts Towers of Simon Rodia State Historic Park
 Will Rogers State Historic Park
 Will Rogers State Beach

National parks, monuments, & refuges 

 Channel Islands National Park
 Hopper Mountain National Wildlife Refuge
 Joshua Tree National Park
 Juan Bautista de Anza National Historic Trail
 Old Spanish National Historic Trail
 Santa Monica Mountains National Recreation Area
 Seal Beach National Wildlife Refuge

Other visitor attractions

 Balboa Fun Zone
 Balboa Island
 Balboa Pier
 Bear Mountain Ski Resort
 Big Bear Lake
 Catalina Island
 Cathedral of Our Lady of the Angels
 Crystal Cathedral
 Devil's Punchbowl
 El Capitan Theatre
 Exposition Park
 Grauman's Chinese Theatre
 Griffith Park
 Hollywood Boulevard
 Hollywood Bowl
 Hollywood Sign
 Hollywood Walk of Fame
 Irvine Regional Park
 Jet Propulsion Laboratory
 La Brea Tar Pits
 Mount Wilson Observatory
 Murals of Los Angeles
 Newport Bay
 O'Neill Regional Park
 Orange County Great Park
 Palm Springs Aerial Tramway
 Santa Monica Pier
 Universal City
 Venice

Area and ZIP codes

Area codes

 213 – Downtown Los Angeles, surrounded by 323 (October 1947)
 310/424 – Santa Monica, Malibu, Pacific Palisades, Compton, Lynwood, Torrance, Beverly Hills, Catalina Island; the southwestern portion of Los Angeles County. (Split from 213 on November 2, 1991; overlaid by 424 on August 26, 2006)
 323 – a ring around downtown Los Angeles, including the Hollywood and Eagle Rock neighborhoods of Los Angeles; South Los Angeles; the cities of South Gate, Huntington Park, Vernon, Walnut Park, Florence, Bell, Bell Gardens, Cudahy, Montebello, and East Los Angeles. (Split from 213 on June 13, 1998)
 442/760 – Coachella Valley, including Palm Springs and Indio; Victor Valley, including Victorville and Apple Valley
 562 – Long Beach, Downey, Whittier; Norwalk, Lakewood, Bellflower, Paramount, Cerritos, southeast Los Angeles County, and a small portion of coastal Orange County. (Split from 310 on January 25, 1997)
 626 – Pasadena, Monterey Park, Rowland Heights, Alhambra, and West Covina; the San Gabriel Valley, and eastern suburbs of Los Angeles. (Split from 818 on June 14, 1997)
 657/714 – Anaheim, Huntington Beach, Santa Ana, Orange, Garden Grove; northern and western Orange County (Overlaid by 657 on September 23, 2008)
 661 – Bakersfield, Santa Clarita, Palmdale; northern Los Angeles County including the Antelope Valley, and most of Kern County, including the southern San Joaquin Valley. (Split from 805 on February 13, 1999)
 747/818 – the cities of Burbank, Glendale, San Fernando; the North Hollywood, Van Nuys, Panorama City, Sherman Oaks, and Northridge neighborhoods of Los Angeles; the San Fernando Valley. (Split from 213 on January 7, 1984)
 805/820 – Ventura County, including the cities of Oxnard, Simi Valley, Thousand Oaks, and Ventura
 909 – Southwest San Bernardino County and the far eastern L.A. County suburbs of Pomona, Walnut, Diamond Bar, San Dimas, La Verne, and Claremont. (Split from 714 on November 14, 1992)
 949 – Irvine, Laguna Beach, Newport Beach, San Juan Capistrano; southern and eastern Orange County. (Split from 714 on April 18, 1998)
 951 – Corona, Hemet, Jurupa Valley, Lake Elsinore, Menifee, Moreno Valley, Riverside, Temecula; western end of Riverside County. (Split from 909 on July 17, 2004)

Media

The Los Angeles metropolitan area is home to the headquarters of several well-known media companies including: the Los Angeles Times, Fox Broadcasting Company, Universal Studios, and The Walt Disney Company. Local television channels broadcasting to the Los Angeles market include KCBS-TV 2 (CBS), KNBC 4 (NBC), KTLA 5 (The CW), KABC 7 (ABC), KCAL-TV 9 (Independent), KTTV 11 (Fox), KCOP 13 (MyNetworkTV), KCET 28, (PBS), KPXN-TV 30 (Ion), KMEX-DT 34 (Univision), KVEA 52 (Telemundo) and KLCS 58 (PBS). Radio stations serving the area include: KKJZ, KIIS, KNX (AM), and KMZT.

Education

Primary and secondary education
The Los Angeles Unified School District serves the city of L.A., and other school districts serve the surrounding areas. A number of private schools are also located in the region.

Higher education

Greater Los Angeles is home to a number of colleges and universities. The University of Southern California and University of California, Los Angeles, are among the largest, and the Claremont Colleges and California Institute of Technology are among the most academically renowned. Below is a list of colleges and universities within the Los Angeles Metropolitan Area.

 Azusa Pacific University
 California State University Bakersfield (Antelope Valley satellite campus)
 California State University, Channel Islands
 California State University, Dominguez Hills
 California State University, Fullerton
California State University, Northridge
 California State University, Long Beach
 California State University, Los Angeles
 California State University, San Bernardino
 California State Polytechnic University, Pomona
 California Institute of Technology
 Chapman University
 Claremont Colleges
 Laguna College of Art and Design
 University of California, Irvine
 University of California, Los Angeles
 University of California, Riverside
 University of Southern California
 Pepperdine University
 Soka University of America
 Vanguard University
 West Coast University

Transportation

Greater Los Angeles is known for its expansive transportation network. Most notable is its extensive highway system. The area is a junction for numerous interstates coming from the north, east, and south and contains the three principal north–south highways in California: Interstate 5, U.S. Route 101, and California State Route 1. The area is also home to several ports, including the twin ports of Long Beach and Los Angeles, which are the two busiest in the United States, as well as Port of Hueneme. Additionally, the region is also served by the Metrorail and Metrolink commuter rail systems that link neighborhoods of Los Angeles with immediate surrounding suburbs and most of the region (excluding the outer region of the Inland Empire) with Oceanside in San Diego County, respectively. Los Angeles International Airport (LAX) is the principal international airport of the region and is one of the busiest in the world. Other airports include Ontario International Airport (ONT), John Wayne Airport (SNA), Bob Hope Airport (BUR), Long Beach Municipal Airport (LGB), and Palm Springs International Airport (PSP).

Commercial airports

The primary airport serving the LA metro area is Los Angeles International Airport (LAX), one of the busiest airports in the United States. LAX is in southwestern Los Angeles,  from Downtown Los Angeles. LAX is the only airport to serve as a hub for all three U.S. legacy airlines —American, Delta and United.

In addition to LAX, other airports, including Hollywood Burbank Airport, John Wayne Airport, Long Beach Airport, Ontario International Airport, and San Bernardino International Airport also serve the region.

Bridges
The Los Angeles metropolitan area has only one suspension bridge: Vincent Thomas Bridge in San Pedro, and one cable-stayed bridge: Gerald Desmond Bridge in Long Beach.

Interstates

  Golden State Freeway/Santa Ana Freeway/San Diego Freeway/Montgomery Freeway (Interstate 5)
  Santa Monica Freeway/Rosa Parks Freeway/San Bernardino Freeway (Interstate 10)
  Escondido Freeway/Temecula Valley Freeway/Corona Freeway/Ontario Freeway/Mojave Freeway (Interstate 15)
  Glenn Anderson Freeway/Century Freeway (Interstate 105)
  Harbor Freeway (Interstate 110)
  Foothill Freeway (Interstate 210)
  Escondido Freeway/Armed Forces Freeway/Barstow Freeway (Interstate 215)
  San Diego Freeway (Interstate 405)
  San Gabriel River Freeway (Interstate 605)
  Long Beach Freeway (Interstate 710)

U.S. highways
  Will Rogers Highway (Former U.S. Route 66)
  Pacific Highway (Former U.S. Route 99)
  Santa Ana Freeway/Hollywood Freeway (U.S. Route 101)

California state highways

  State Route 1
  State Route 2
  State Route 14
  State Route 18
  State Route 19
  State Route 22
  State Route 23
  State Route 27
  State Route 33
  State Route 34
  State Route 39
  State Route 47
  State Route 55
  State Route 57
  State Route 60
  State Route 66
  State Route 71
  State Route 72
  State Route 73
  State Route 74
  State Route 83
  State Route 90
  State Route 91
  State Route 103
  State Route 107
  State Route 110
  State Route 118
  State Route 126
  State Route 133
  State Route 134
  State Route 138
  State Route 142
  State Route 170
  State Route 187
  State Route 210
  State Route 213
  State Route 241
  State Route 261

Los Angeles County Metro

The Metro Rail is the mass transit rail system of Los Angeles County. It is run by the Los Angeles County Metropolitan Transportation Authority and its system runs six rail lines throughout Los Angeles County. Metro Rail currently operates five light rail lines and two rapid transit subway lines, altogether totaling  of rail, 101 stations, and over 360,000 daily weekday boardings .
 The A Line (Blue) – Light Rail
 The B Line (Red) – Heavy Rail
 The C Line (Green) – Light Rail
 The D Line (Purple) – Heavy Rail
 The E Line (Expo) – Light Rail
 The G Line (Orange) – Busway
 The J Line (Silver) – Busway
 The K Line (Crenshaw/LAX) - Light Rail
 The L Line (Gold) – Light Rail

The systems light rail system is the second busiest LRT system in the United States, after Boston, by number of riders, with 200,300 average weekday boardings during the third quarter of 2012. By 2019, it had become the most heavily ridden light rail system in the country.

Since the region of the city is in close proximity to a major fault area the tunnels were built to resist earthquakes of up to magnitude 7.5. Both subway lines use an electrified third rail to provide power to the trains, rendering these lines unusable on the other three. The Blue and Gold Lines run mostly at grade, with some street-running, elevated, and underground stretches in the more densely populated areas of Los Angeles. The Green Line is entirely grade separated, running in the median of I-105 and then turning southward along an elevated route.

The rail lines run regularly on a 5 am and midnight schedule, seven days a week. Limited service on particular segments is provided after midnight and before 5 am There is no rail service between 2 and 3:30 am Exact times vary from route to route; see individual route articles for more information.

Orange County Transportation Authority (OCTA)

Regional and commuter rail
There are two providers of heavy rail transportation in the region, Amtrak and Metrolink. Amtrak provides service to San Diego, Santa Barbara, San Luis Obispo, and points in between on the Pacific Surfliner. It also provides long-distance routes, including the Coast Starlight which goes to the San Francisco Bay Area, Portland, Oregon, and Seattle, Washington; the Southwest Chief which goes to Flagstaff, Arizona, Albuquerque, New Mexico, Kansas City, Missouri and Chicago; and the Sunset Limited which provides limited service (three days a week) to Tucson, El Paso, Houston, and New Orleans.

Metrolink provides service to numerous places within Southern California, including all counties in the region. Metrolink operates to 55 stations on seven lines within Southern California which mostly (except for the Inland Empire–Orange County Line) radiate from Los Angeles Union Station.

Sports

Professional teams

As a whole, the Los Angeles area has more national championships, all sports combined (college and professional), than any other city in the United States, with over four times as many championships as the entire state of Texas, and just over twice that of New York City. It is the only American city to host the summer Olympic games twice: once in 1932, and more recently in 1984 (Lake Placid hosted the winter Olympic games twice: once in 1932 and once in 1980). Los Angeles will also be the host of the 2028 Summer Olympics, becoming the third city to host three Olympic Games, after London and Paris.

Table of professional teams and venues

Other professional venues include:
 Auto Club Raceway, Pomona
 Auto Club Speedway
 John C. Argue Swim Stadium
 Long Beach Marine Stadium
 Los Angeles Memorial Coliseum (Temporary)
 Rose Bowl
 Santa Anita Park
 Kia Forum
 VELO Sports Center

NCAA Division I college sports

 California Baptist Lancers
 Cal State Fullerton Titans
 Cal State Northridge Matadors
 Long Beach State Beach
 Loyola Marymount Lions
 Pepperdine Waves
 UC Irvine Anteaters
 UC Riverside Highlanders
 UCLA Bruins (FBS)
 USC Trojans (FBS)

Other sports
The Greater Los Angeles area also has three well-known horse racing facilities: Santa Anita Park, Los Alamitos Race Course and the former Hollywood Park Racetrack and three major motorsport venues: Auto Club Speedway, Long Beach street circuit, and Auto Club Raceway at Pomona. In addition, the city of Los Angeles hosted the Summer Olympics in 1932 and 1984.

For over twenty years the Los Angeles area media market lacked a National Football League team. After the 1994 season, the Los Angeles Rams moved to St. Louis, Missouri, and the Los Angeles Raiders returned to their original home of Oakland, California, due to the lack of an up-to-date NFL stadium. After numerous stadium proposals between 1995 and 2016 in an attempt to bring the NFL back, the Oakland Raiders, St. Louis Rams, and San Diego Chargers all submitted plans to relocate back to Los Angeles after the 2015 NFL season. On January 12, 2016, the Rams were approved to move to Los Angeles and build the venue eventually known as SoFi Stadium with the Chargers or Raiders given the option to join them. On January 12, 2017, the Chargers announced their move to Los Angeles to join the Rams. Both teams share SoFi Stadium in Inglewood, California.

See also

 California megapolitan areas
 Largest metropolitan areas in the Americas
 List of hotels in Los Angeles
 Los Angeles Basin
 Southern California

References

 
Metropolitan areas of California
Regions of California
Southern California
Tourism regions of California